Dachsbracke may refer to:

Alpine Dachsbracke, breed of dog originating in Austria
Westphalian Dachsbracke, breed of dog originating in Westphalia, Germany
Drever, also known as Schwedische Dachsbracke in German

See also
Dachshund